The Singapore Lacrosse Association (SLA) is the organization that focuses on the growth of lacrosse development in Singapore. Formed in October 2012, the SLA became the 47th member of the Federation of International Lacrosse on 30 July 2013.

References

External links
 

Lacrosse governing bodies in Asia
Lacrosse in Singapore
Lacrosse
2012 establishments in Singapore
Sports organizations established in 2012